William A. Smith (born February 14, 1949) is a retired American professional basketball center who played two seasons in the National Basketball Association (NBA) as a member of the Portland Trail Blazers (1971–73). He was drafted by the Blazers in the third round (42  pick overall) of the 1971 NBA Draft from Syracuse University, where he holds the individual player single game scoring record of 47 points achieved on January 14, 1971 against Lafayette College.

External links

1949 births
Living people
American men's basketball players
Basketball players from New York (state)
Centers (basketball)
Portland Trail Blazers draft picks
Portland Trail Blazers players
Sportspeople from Rochester, New York
Syracuse Orange men's basketball players